Holman is a masculine given name which may refer to:

 Holman Day (1865–1935), American author
 William Holman Hunt (1827–1910), British painter
 Holman S. Melcher (1841–1905), American Civil War officer
 Holman Williams (1912–1967), American boxer

Masculine given names